Kenneth Dubuque Memorial State Forest is a Massachusetts state forest in the northern Berkshire Hills in the towns of Hawley, Plainfield, and Savoy. The forest is managed by the Department of Conservation and Recreation (DCR). In 1985, the forest was named in memory of Kenneth M. Dubuque, a former employee of the Department of Environmental Management.

Activities and amenities
Trails: Some  of trails are designated for mixed use including horseback riding, mountain biking, cross-country skiing, and snowmobiling. Two small shelters may be found along the trails.
Artifacts: Historical artifacts in the forest include cellar holes of abandoned South Hawley village, an unusual beehive-shaped fieldstone charcoal kiln, and the remains of a mill complex at Hallockville Pond. 
The forest also features wilderness camping, canoeing, fishing, and restricted hunting.
The Massachusetts Student Conservation Association–AmeriCorps program is headquartered at Hallockville Pond.

The effects of Hurricane Irene resulted in the forest's closure in 2011. As of 2014, road conditions were deemed to be safe for travel "in most areas."

See also

List of Massachusetts state forests

References

External links 
Kenneth Dubuque Memorial State Forest Department of Conservation and Recreation
Dubuque Memorial State Forest Trail Map Department of Conservation and Recreation

Massachusetts state forests
Parks in Franklin County, Massachusetts
Parks in Hampshire County, Massachusetts
Parks in Berkshire County, Massachusetts
Hawley, Massachusetts
Plainfield, Massachusetts
Savoy, Massachusetts